"I Don't Know What It Is" is a single by Canadian-American singer-songwriter Rufus Wainwright, released in a slim-line jewel case format on July 26, 2004. It is from his third studio album Want One (2003). In addition to the UK and Japanese versions of Want One, the song also appears on the bonus DVD that accompanies Want Two (Rufus Wainwright: Live at the Fillmore), All I Want (DVD), and Want, a repackaged UK double album that contains Want One and Want Two.

Composition
In All I Want, producer Marius de Vries admitted that "I Don't Know What It Is" was one of the most complex production challenges he had ever faced, with its hundreds of layers of separate orchestral, choral, and vocal parts. Between "running around" and "chugging along" "on a train going God knows where to" in a sort of aimless wander, transportation is a major theme of the song. Wainwright alludes to several locations, from precise ones such as Calais, Dover, Poland and Lower Manhattan to more abstract locales like Heaven, Hell, and Limbo. Wainwright said of the song:

References are also made to the American sitcom Three's Company; "knock on the door", "take a step that is new", and "three's company" all allude to the TV show's theme song. "Taking the Santa Fe and the Atchison, Topeka" is a reference to Judy Garland's The Harvey Girls, which itself contains an allusion to the Atchison, Topeka and Santa Fe Railway.

Promotion
Wainwright performed the song on Late Show with David Letterman on October 6, 2003.

Track listing
"I Don't Know What It Is"
"L'Absence" (from Hector Berlioz's Les nuits d'été, op. 7)
"14th Street"

Both B-sides were recorded live at The Fillmore in San Francisco in March 2004.

Chart performance
"I Don't Know What It Is" appeared on the UK Singles Chart for one week, entering on August 7, 2004, and reaching a peak chart position at No. 74.

Personnel

 Rufus Wainwright – voice, piano, orchestral arrangements
 Marius de Vries – programming, orchestral arrangements
 Joy Smith – harp
 Isobel Griffiths – orchestra contractor
 Gavyn Wright – orchestra leader
 Alexis Smith – programming
 Simon C Clarke – flute
 Roddy Lorimer – trumpet
 Paul Spong – trumpet
 Annie Whitehead – trombone
 Dave Stewart – bass trombone
 Sterling Campbell – drums
 Jeff Hill – bass
 Gerry Leonard – guitar
 Charlie Sexton – guitar
 Jimmy Zhivago – guitar
 Alexandra Knoll – oboe
 David Sapadin – clarinet
 Daniel Shelly – bassoon
 Maxim Moston – orchestral arrangements
 Chris Elliott – orchestral arrangements

References

2003 songs
2004 debut singles
DreamWorks Records singles
Rufus Wainwright songs
Song recordings produced by Marius de Vries
Songs written by Rufus Wainwright